Teton River may refer to:

Teton River (Montana), a tributary of the Missouri River in Montana, U.S.
Teton River (Idaho), a tributary of the Snake River in Wyoming and Idaho, U.S.

See also
Tieton River